Sultan bin Bajad bin Hameed al-Otaybi ( Sulṭan ibn Bajad ibn Ḥamīd Al ʿOtaibī; 1876 – 1932) was a member of the Otaibah tribe and one of the leaders of the Ikhwan movement in Saudi Arabia, the tribal army that supported King Abdulaziz in his unification of Saudi Arabia between 1910 and 1927.

Al-Otaybi was illiterate and very religious, strongly believing in Salafi principles. After the occupation of Hijaz, King Abdulaziz and several of the Ikhwan leaders including Faisal Al Duwaish and Dhaydan bin Hithlain went into bloody clashes, as Abdulaziz wanted to stop incursions outside of Arabia and concentrate on building the foundations of a modern state. Al-Otaybi and his associates considered this a sin and challenged the agreements, made by the King with the British and neighboring powers. Al-Otaybi entered into an open rebellion against the Al Saud forces and joined in the Battle of Sabilla. He was captured by the Al Saud forces and put in prison where he died in 1932.

One of his daughters married Muhammad bin Abdul Rahman, half-brother of King Abdulaziz.

Al-Ghata'at
Sultan bin Bijad established the hijra al-ghutat, the most important and most well-prepared hijra of the Ikhwan, as described by the brother of King Abdul Aziz, Prince Musaed bin Abdul Rahman Al Saud in the book The Saudis and the Islamic Solution.    Sultan bin Bijad and Princess Madawi bint Mansour bin Abdul Aziz says about her in her study of desertion during the reign of King Abdulaziz: During the reign of her sheikh Sultan bin Bijad, the emigration gained great fame and five thousand fighters came out of the jihad Sultan bin Bijad .    Sultan bin Bijad said about them, Sheikh Abdullah bin Abdul Rahman bin Aqla, the deputy of the Two Holy Mosques in the presidency of His Eminence Sheikh Abdul Malik bin Duhaish: Do not forget the virtue of the people, the people of the delusion, those with guidance, opinion, and morals.  Hajj Mutawa Al-Sabi

Battle of Turubah 

After the end of the First World War and the stability of Hussein bin Ali as king in the Hijaz, King Hussein prepared an army led by his son, Sharif Abdullah bin Al Hussein, and ordered him to march on Khurmah, and that was on May 25, 1919, AD - 26/8/1337 AH. Abdullah advanced and entered Turbah, which is nearby  from Al-Khurma.  Ibn Saud sent a force headed by Sultan al-Din bin Bijad to help Khalid bin Louay, the prince of Al-Khurmah, and Abdullah bin Al-Hussein was surprised by a raid (the Brotherhood) before dawn, led by Sultan bin Bijad.  Few have escaped

Conquest of the Hejaz 
Sharif Hussein prevented the people of Najd from performing the pilgrimage, and this increased in their souls, especially the Ikhwan, so at the end of June 1924, King Abdul Aziz chaired a conference in Riyadh, attended by Najd scholars, heads of tribes and villages and leaders of the Ikhwan, and Abdul Aziz obtained in this conference a legal fatwa, to wage war on the Sharif to ensure the freedom to perform the Hajj, so the Riyadh Conference issued a decision to invade the Hejaz and orders were sent to the Ikhwan forces stationed in Torbah and Al-Khurmah to prepare, just as the orders reached their leader Sultan bin Bijad to move towards Taif

The capture of Taif 
In the month of Safar, the vanguards of the Ikhwan, eager to fight, were on the outskirts of Taif, led by Sultan bin Bijad and with him all 3000 thousand fighters. They attacked Ali bin Hussein's forces and defeated them. The Ikhwan's forces entered Taif and committed a massacre in which the number of dead is estimated at 300 civilians. Then after the control of Taif, the road was clear. To Mecca and the Ikhwan wanted to continue on their path, but King Abdul Aziz asked them to stop.

The capture of Mecca and Jeddah 
On the 17th of Rabi’ al-Awwal in the year 1342 A.H., the brothers entered Makkah with their weapons, carrying two Muharrams at his age. The two leaders of the Ikhwan, Sultan bin Bijad and Khalid bin Louay, sent letters to the delegates of the countries and their consuls in Jeddah informing them of their occupation of Makkah and inquiring about their position towards the war. So they received a reply from the Consul of the United Kingdom, the Consul of the Kingdom of Italy, the Under-Consul of France, the Vice-Consul of the Netherlands, and the Deputy Consul of the Shah informing Ibn Bijad that they were completely neutral in the face of the war. The Ikhwan and those who were with King Abdul-Aziz and besieged Jeddah and on the 6th of Jumada al-Thani in the year 1344 AH, Jeddah surrendered after a long siege that lasted for a whole year. Then the annexation of Taif and Mecca. In the year 1342 AH, his forces entered Makkah Al-Mukarramah, along with Sharif Khalid bin Luay, two Muharrams, after Sharif Hussein withdrew from it. He participated in the siege of Jeddah.

Sheikh Muhammad bin Othman, “the Ikhwan sheikh and judge,” describes their entry into Makkah al-Mukarramah in the book of the Mahmudiyah Group, saying: "We entered with our heads uncovered We walked around with lights and wood Let's grow up on Marw and Safa And those bright, delicious spots They are the brothers, as long as they are happy Nor is the secret of those who blame them They have an example in the company of their Prophet And their illusion is spent with the consequences."

The case of the siege of Jeddah 
Ikhwan leaders insisted on the conquest of Jeddah, so Abdul Aziz opposed them not for fear of them - he was silent about their control of Taif and Mecca - but for fear of the intervention of the English fleet stationed on the coast to protect foreign nationals. During the siege, Sultan bin Bijad and Faisal al-Dawish demanded to appoint them two princes over Mecca and Medina, and in another narration they requested the Emirate of Medina for Ad-Dawish because he was the one who conquered it, and the emirate of Taif and Mecca for Ibn Bijad because he was the one who conquered it. But Imam Abdul-Aziz refused that, taking into account the feelings of the Hijazis on the one hand, and on the other hand limiting the appointment of provincial princes to the House of Saud. He appointed Abdullah bin Jalawi as Emir of Al-Ahsa and his cousin Abdul Aziz Bin Musaed as Emir of Hail. Suspicions began to circulate between the two leaders that Abdulaziz Al Saud wanted power to be confined to his family only and that the fighting was for this purpose, and this contradicts their religious beliefs.

The case of the Egyptian Mahmal 
The summer of 1925 witnessed the first pilgrimage season after the conquest of Mecca, and the city was full of brothers who came for the pilgrimage. The Egyptians were keen to give a good impression of them to the new King of Hejaz, so he entered the Mahmal, led by a musical group, surrounded by Egyptian guards. The Ikhwan demanded that the musicians stop their playing because this is considered sacrilege, so they did not pay attention to them and continued their path as they used to do in the past years. The brothers attacked them by order of Ibn Bijad and shot them and killed some of them. The mediation of Prince Faisal bin Abdulaziz did not work. The result was that the Egyptians severed their relations with the new government and refused to weave the covering after that, and thus the Egyptian bearing stopped. So the brothers bequeathed a political problem to their imam as soon as they came into contact with other Muslim groups

References 

19th-century Arabs
1876 births
1932 deaths
History of Saudi Arabia
Ikhwan
Saudi Arabian military personnel
Saudi Arabian prisoners and detainees
Saudi Arabian Salafis